Yaakov (Yaki) Dolf (born 1976) is an Israeli Brigadier General.

Military career
Dolf was drafted into the IDF in 1994. He volunteered as a paratrooper in the Paratroopers Brigade. He served as a soldier and a squad leader in the 890th Battalion. He became an infantry officer after completing Officer Candidate School and return to the Paratroopers Brigade as a platoon leader and company commander in counter-guerrilla operations in the South Lebanon security zone. Later on he served as the Brigade's Executive officer during the 2006 Lebanon War, and during Operation Cast Lead Dolf led the 890th Paratroopers Battalion. Afterwards he commanded a Regional Brigade in the Gaza Division and a reserve Paratroopers Brigade. In 2017 he was named commander of the Paratroopers Brigade and served in this position until 2021. During his tenure as the commander of the Paratroopers Brigade, he was reprimanded over  the deaths of two recruits during training exercises. He was subsequently appointed military secretary to Defense Minister Benny Gantz. In July 2022, it was announced that he would succeed Avi Bluth as commander of the Judea and Samaria Division.

References

1976 births
Living people
Israeli military personnel